Elizabeth Quadracci, also known as Betty Ewens Quadracci, founded the Sussex, Wisconsin based Quad/Graphics with her husband, Harry V. Quadracci and was the president of Quad Creative, the company's graphic design unit.

In 1983, she became publisher, and eventually president, of Milwaukee Magazine.

Philanthropy 
The main theater at the Milwaukee Repertory Theater is called the Quadracci Powerhouse Theater. The name is in recognition of Quadraccis gift of leadership of the theater company's endowment fund in the 1990s as well as Betty Quadracci's contributions and support of the group as a board member during the 1980s when the theater complex was built.

In 2001, Betty and her husband, Harry V. Quadracci, helped finance an addition to the Milwaukee Art Museum designed by Santiago Calatrava. The Quadraccis donated $10 million in a donation-matching challenge they spearheaded. The addition was named the Quadracci Pavilion.

Betty donated 1 million dollars to Divine Savior Holy Angels High School in Milwaukee to build “The Quad,” a cafeteria and gathering space located outside the school’s theater.

Death 
Betty died at 75 years old in December 2013.

References

External links 
 BQ: A Full Life Lived - Milwaukee Magazine

Year of birth unknown
2013 deaths
People from Waukesha County, Wisconsin
Businesspeople from Wisconsin
Philanthropists from Wisconsin
20th-century American businesspeople
20th-century American businesswomen
21st-century American businesspeople
21st-century American businesswomen
20th-century American philanthropists
21st-century philanthropists